"In Praise of the Vulnerable Man" is a song from Alanis Morissette's seventh studio album, Flavors of Entanglement. 
The single was released to digital download on August 18, 2008.
The digital single includes the radio edit and the b-side "Break". The performance on the TV show "Jimmy Kimmel Live!" was used as the video clip and the only form of disclosure of the single.
The song was performed on the "Flavors of Entanglement Tour".

Track listing 
Digital download
 "In Praise Of the Vulnerable Man" (Radio Edit) – 3:26
 "Break" – 3:09

2008 singles
Songs written by Alanis Morissette
Rock ballads
2008 songs
Songs written by Guy Sigsworth
Song recordings produced by Guy Sigsworth
Maverick Records singles